The Shire of Wellington is a local government area in Victoria, Australia, located in the eastern part of the state.

It includes the towns of Heyfield, Rosedale, Maffra, Sale, Stratford, Coongulla, Newry, Tinamba and Yarram. It was formed in 1994 from the amalgamation of the Shire of Alberton, Shire of Avon, Shire of Maffra, City of Sale and parts of the Shire of Rosedale.

The Shire is governed and administered by the Wellington Shire Council; its seat of local government and administrative centre is located at the council headquarters in Sale, it also has service centres located in Maffra, Stratford and Rosedale. The Shire is named after a major geographical feature in the region, Lake Wellington, which is located in the south-east of the LGA.

Council

Current composition
The Council is composed of three wards and nine councillors, with three councillors per ward elected to represent each ward.

Administration and governance

The Council meets in the Council Chambers of the Wellington Centre in the Port of Sale precinct at 70 Foster Street, which also houses the Gippsland Art Gallery, Visitor Information Centre and Sale Library.  The council headquarters are located over the road at 18 Desailly Street which is the location of the council's administrative activities. It also provides customer services at its service centres in Maffra, Stratford, Rosedale and Yarram.

Townships and localities
The 2021 census, the shire had a population of 45,639 up from 42,983 in the 2016 census

^ - Territory divided with another LGA
* - Not noted in 2016 Census
# - Not noted in 2021 Census

See also
 Central Gippsland
 East Gippsland
 List of localities (Victoria)

References

External links
Wellington Shire Council official website
Metlink local public transport map 
Link to Land Victoria interactive maps

Local government areas of Victoria (Australia)
Gippsland (region)